Of the twenty-four nations involved in 1993 Rugby World Cup Sevens, nineteen were invited and five had to go through pre-tournament 1993 Rugby World Cup Sevens qualifying. Four of the qualification places were won by Namibia, Hong Kong, Taiwan and Spain who booked their places by reaching the semi-finals of one qualifying event in Sicily. Latvia won their place by beating Russia in the final of a mini-tournament staged in Moscow to decide who would replace the USSR, which had broken up since its invite to the world cup.

The invited participants were Argentina, Australia, Canada, England, Fiji, France, Ireland, Italy, Japan, Netherlands, New Zealand, Romania, Scotland, Tonga, South Africa, South Korea, USA, Wales and Western Samoa.

Sicily (1992)
Seventeen nations came to Catania, Sicily, in May 1992 (from 29th to 31st) to battle for four qualifying spots in the finals in 1993. They were divided into three groups, five in one and six in the other two. Taiwan, Namibia, Spain and Hong Kong were the successful qualifiers after three group stages and three knockout rounds. The affair was complicated and confused. The group stages produced a situation where, by the transition from the second to the third groups, the lower ranked teams were better off losing to one another in order to face weaker opposition in stage 3. Also, the two teams with the best records leading into the quarter-finals, Namibia (played 8 won 8) and Zimbabwe (played 9 won 7, drawn 1, lost 1) ended up playing each other. Meanwhile, a Czechoslovakian side that had won just one match made it to the quarterfinals at the expense of Tunisia that had won 5 of 9.

Determination of Pool Winners:
All matches in the tournament carry the following points A Win 3 points, A Draw 2 points, A Loss 1 point. The team with the greatest number of points at the end of preliminary rounds would declared the winner. if teams at this stage are level on points then the winner shall be: (a) the winner of the match in which tied teams played. (b) the team that scored the most tries throughout the Round . (c) the team which has conceded the fewest tries throughout the Round. (d) the total points scored by each team in all matches in the Round shall be divided by total points scored against each team and the team with the higher quotient shall be the winner. Teams eliminated on either group stage participated in the Etna Cup mini-tournament alongside an invitational Sicily side.

The original groups were as follows:

Group stage 1

Pool A
{| class="wikitable" style="text-align: center;"
|-
!width="160"|Teams
!width="40"|Pld
!width="40"|W
!width="40"|D
!width="40"|L
!width="40"|PF
!width="40"|PA
!width="40"|+/−
!width="40"|Pts
|-bgcolor=ccccff
|align=left|
|4||4||0||0||122||6||+116||12
|-bgcolor=ccccff
|align=left|
|4||3||0||1||54||58||−4||10
|-bgcolor=ccccff
|align=left|
|4||2||0||2||43||52||−9||8
|-bgcolor=ccccff
|align=left|
|4||1||0||3||19||55||−36||6
|-bgcolor=ffcccc
|align=left| Arabian Gulf
|4||0||0||4||22||89||−67||4
|}

Pool B
{| class="wikitable" style="text-align: center;"
|-
!width="160"|Teams
!width="40"|Pld
!width="40"|W
!width="40"|D
!width="40"|L
!width="40"|PF
!width="40"|PA
!width="40"|+/−
!width="40"|Pts
|-bgcolor=ccccff
|align=left|
|5||4||1||0||120||44||+76||14
|-bgcolor=ccccff
|align=left|
|5||4||1||0||110||32||+78||14
|-bgcolor=ccccff
|align=left|
|5||3||0||2||66||78||−12||11
|-bgcolor=ccccff
|align=left|
|5||1||1||3||55||88||−33||8
|-bgcolor=ffcccc
|align=left|
|5||1||0||4||40||103||−63||7
|-bgcolor=ffcccc
|align=left|
|5||0||1||4||40||86||−46||6
|}

Pool C
{| class="wikitable" style="text-align: center;"
|-
!width="160"|Teams
!width="40"|Pld
!width="40"|W
!width="40"|D
!width="40"|L
!width="40"|PF
!width="40"|PA
!width="40"|+/−
!width="40"|Pts
|-bgcolor=ccccff
|align=left|
|5||4||1||0||112||34||+78||14
|-bgcolor=ccccff
|align=left|
|5||4||0||1||78||46||+32||13
|-bgcolor=ccccff
|align=left|
|5||3||1||1||80||36||+44||12
|-bgcolor=ccccff
|align=left|
|5||2||0||3||56||60||−4||9
|-bgcolor=ffcccc
|align=left|
|5||0||1||4||38||100||−62||6
|-bgcolor=ffcccc
|align=left|
|5||0||1||4||24||112||−88||6
|}

Group stage 2
Pool D
{| class="wikitable" style="text-align: center;"
|-
!width="160"|Teams
!width="40"|Pld
!width="40"|W
!width="40"|D
!width="40"|L
!width="40"|PF
!width="40"|PA
!width="40"|+/−
!width="40"|Pts
|-
|align=left|
|2||2||0||0||52||14||+38||6
|-
|align=left|
|2||1||0||1||22||40||−18||4
|-
|align=left|
|2||0||0||2||22||42||−20||2
|}

Pool E
{| class="wikitable" style="text-align: center;"
|-
!width="160"|Teams
!width="40"|Pld
!width="40"|W
!width="40"|D
!width="40"|L
!width="40"|PF
!width="40"|PA
!width="40"|+/−
!width="40"|Pts
|-
|align=left|
|2||2||0||0||38||20||+18||6
|-
|align=left|
|2||1||0||1||40||18||+22||4
|-
|align=left|
|2||0||0||2||4||44||−40||2
|}

Pool F
{| class="wikitable" style="text-align: center;"
|-
!width="160"|Teams
!width="40"|Pld
!width="40"|W
!width="40"|D
!width="40"|L
!width="40"|PF
!width="40"|PA
!width="40"|+/−
!width="40"|Pts
|-
|align=left|
|2||2||0||0||36||20||+16||6
|-
|align=left|
|2||1||0||1||28||24||+4||4
|-
|align=left|
|2||0||0||2||16||36||−20||2
|}

Pool G
{| class="wikitable" style="text-align: center;"
|-
!width="160"|Teams
!width="40"|Pld
!width="40"|W
!width="40"|D
!width="40"|L
!width="40"|PF
!width="40"|PA
!width="40"|+/−
!width="40"|Pts
|-
|align=left|
|2||2||0||0||42||16||+26||6
|-
|align=left|
|2||0||1||1||28||42||−14||3
|-
|align=left|
|2||0||1||1||12||24||−12||3
|}

Group stage 3
No team was eliminated from stage 2, just rearranged on new seedings that went into Pools H, I, L and M. These four pools of three teams each meant that each team had to play a further two matches and this process resulted in eight teams given a new seeding for the quarterfinals, with four teams eliminated, to play in the Etna Cup.

Pool H
{| class="wikitable" style="text-align: center;"
|-
!width="160"|Teams
!width="40"|Pld
!width="40"|W
!width="40"|D
!width="40"|L
!width="40"|PF
!width="40"|PA
!width="40"|+/−
!width="40"|Pts
|-bgcolor=ccccff
|align=left|
|2||2||0||0||46||4||+42||6
|-bgcolor=ccccff
|align=left|
|2||1||0||1||16||30||−14||4
|-bgcolor=ffcccc
|align=left|
|2||0||0||2||6||34||−28||2
|}

Pool I
{| class="wikitable" style="text-align: center;"
|-
!width="160"|Teams
!width="40"|Pld
!width="40"|W
!width="40"|D
!width="40"|L
!width="40"|PF
!width="40"|PA
!width="40"|+/−
!width="40"|Pts
|-bgcolor=ccccff
|align=left|
|2||2||0||0||49||16||+33||6
|-bgcolor=ccccff
|align=left|
|2||0||1||1||20||40||−20||3
|-bgcolor=ffcccc
|align=left|
|2||0||1||1||16||29||−13||3
|}

Pool L
{| class="wikitable" style="text-align: center;"
|-
!width="160"|Teams
!width="40"|Pld
!width="40"|W
!width="40"|D
!width="40"|L
!width="40"|PF
!width="40"|PA
!width="40"|+/−
!width="40"|Pts
|-bgcolor=ccccff
|align=left|
|2||2||0||0||56||0||+56||6
|-bgcolor=ccccff
|align=left|
|2||1||0||1||14||42||−28||4
|-bgcolor=ffcccc
|align=left|
|2||0||0||2||14||38||−28||2
|}

Pool M
{| class="wikitable" style="text-align: center;"
|-
!width="160"|Teams
!width="40"|Pld
!width="40"|W
!width="40"|D
!width="40"|L
!width="40"|PF
!width="40"|PA
!width="40"|+/−
!width="40"|Pts
|-bgcolor=ccccff
|align=left|
|2||2||0||0||40||12||+28||6
|-bgcolor=ccccff
|align=left|
|2||1||0||1||30||20||+10||4
|-bgcolor=ffcccc
|align=left|
|2||0||0||2||4||42||−38||2
|}

Knockout round
(31 May 1992)

Etna Cup

Round 1 Etna Cup (30 May 1992)

Round 2 Etna Cup (31 May 1992)

Quarter-finals

 won  lost

 won   lost

 won   lost

 10 - 10  (extra time 14–10)

Semi-finals

 won   lost

 won   lost

Final

 won   lost

The Sicilian team were completely fresh and faced opponents who in some cases had played nine draining games. Sicily entered Sunday having played a total of two games. The final was contested by Sicily and Tunisia. Although Tunisia led by 2 points when normal time expired, the Italian referee allowed play to continue until, in the fourteenth minute of the second half, the Sicilians scored.

Former USSR representative
Although the Soviet Union had originally been an invited team, it had subsequently collapsed and the former constituent nations, demanded their own qualifying event. This was held in Moscow where the Latvia team, in their first ever sporting event, overcame Ukraine and Kazakhstan to reach the final where they beat Russia to claim the last place in Edinburgh.

References

Rugby World Cup Sevens qualification
S